Konstantin Yemelyanov (born 29 August 1968) is a Russian sailor. He competed in the Tornado event at the 2000 Summer Olympics.

References

External links
 

1968 births
Living people
Russian male sailors (sport)
Olympic sailors of Russia
Sailors at the 2000 Summer Olympics – Tornado
Place of birth missing (living people)